Lavarone (Cimbrian: Lavròu; in local dialect Lavarón) is a comune (municipality) in Trentino in the northern Italian region Trentino-Südtirol Tyrol–South Tyrol–Trentino Euroregion, located about  southeast of Trento.

The municipality of Lavarone contains the frazioni (subdivisions): Chiesa, Cappella, Gionghi, Masetti, Villanova, Longhi, Magrè, Slaghenaufi, Bertoldi, Nicolussi, Piccoli, Oseli, Gasperi, Lanzino, Albertini, Rocchetti, Malga Laghetto, Stengheli, Azzolini and Masi di Sotto.

Lavarone borders the following municipalities: Caldonazzo, Luserna, Folgaria, Pedemonte, Levico Terme and Lastebasse.

Until the beginning of the 20th century the people of Lavarone spoke Cimbrian, an ancient German Bavarian dialect.

Demographic evolution

References

External links
 
 Homepage of the city

Cities and towns in Trentino-Alto Adige/Südtirol